Jing Abalos (born September 17, 1941) is a Filipino actor. Abalos is a member of the S.O.S. Daredevils and has also worked a stunt instructor. He was born in Bayambang, Pangasinan and raised in Camiling,  Tarlac.

Abalos was the third of the six children of Angelita Asuncion and Rufino Abalos. He finished his elementary and high school  in Camiling College and he reached the first year Mechanical Engineering in Far Eastern University in Manila.

His first film was Amazona. He was introduced in the film Apat Na Agila (alternative title "Four Eagles"), and became a full-fledged star in Batman Fights Dracula under Lea Production in 1967, opposite Viviane Lorrain.

Abalos became a contract star of Lea Production and made several films in Taurus Production's The Lady Untouchable opposite Magda Gonzalez.

Filmography
Amazona (1957)
Apat na Agila (1967)
Batman Fights Dracula (1967) as Batman/Bruce Wayne
Lady Untouchable (1968)
Cueva Vaca (1972)
Dirty Hari (1972)
Mga Mapanganib (1972)
Trafcon-Ancar Limbas Unit 57 (1972)
Johnny Tanggo Rides Again... Tatanga-tanga, Dakila Naman (1982)

References

External links

1941 births
Living people
20th-century Filipino male actors
Far Eastern University alumni
Filipino male film actors
Male actors from Pangasinan
People from Tarlac